The Rookie is an American police procedural crime drama television series created by Alexi Hawley for ABC. The series follows John Nolan, a man in his forties, who becomes the oldest rookie at the Los Angeles Police Department. The series is produced by ABC Signature and Entertainment One; it is based on real-life Los Angeles Police Department officer William Norcross, who moved to Los Angeles in 2015 and joined the department in his mid-40s.

The series stars Nathan Fillion, Alyssa Diaz, Richard T. Jones, Titus Makin Jr., Melissa O'Neil, Afton Williamson, Mekia Cox, Shawn Ashmore, Michael Trucco and Eric Winter. The Rookie premiered on October 16, 2018. In March 2022, the series was renewed for a fifth season, which premiered on September 25, 2022.

Premise
The series follows John Nolan, a 45-year-old newly divorced man from Pennsylvania, who, after inadvertently helping police officers during a bank robbery, moves to Los Angeles to pursue a new career as a police officer in the Los Angeles Police Department (LAPD). After graduating from the Police Academy as the oldest rookie on the force, Nolan must navigate the dangerous, unpredictable nature of his job and is determined to make it in his new career despite the challenges.

Series lead Nathan Fillion stated during an interview that the drama was inspired by a true story as the LAPD is one of just two agencies that accepts new officers over the age of 37. The man whose story inspired the premise of the show was later revealed to be Bill Norcross, a college friend of executive producer Jon Steinberg, who based the show on his story. Norcross continues to serve in the LAPD and also as executive producer on The Rookie.

Episodes

Cast and characters

Main

 Nathan Fillion as John Nolan: The oldest rookie (Police Officer III) at the Los Angeles Police Department (LAPD), he is assigned to the Mid-Wilshire Division. He studied law at Pennsylvania State University but dropped out and went into the construction business upon learning that Sarah, his girlfriend and later wife, was pregnant. At the age of 45, Nolan closed his construction company in Pennsylvania and moved out west to become a police officer. He is divorced with a 19-year-old son, Henry, who is a freshman in college.
 Alyssa Diaz as Angela Lopez: An LAPD detective (Detective I). She is assigned as the training officer to Jackson West (Season 1-3). She becomes an inspiring Latina detective and mother in the later seasons.
 Richard T. Jones as Wade Grey: A sergeant (Sergeant II) and watch commander at the Mid-Wilshire Station. Grey initially believes that Nolan may be changing career because of a possible midlife crisis and doubts that he is suitable for police work, but later sees his potential. Grey served in the United States Army prior to joining the LAPD. He has a daughter who is planning to go to college in the fall.
 Titus Makin Jr. as Jackson West (seasons 1–3): An eager, if somewhat naive, rookie (Police Officer II) and the son of Commander West, head of the LAPD's Internal Affairs Division. Top of his class at the Police Academy, he is firmly committed to the LAPD and strives to be the best officer he can as he wants to maintain his family's traditions.
 Mercedes Mason as Zoe Andersen (season 1; guest season 3): Nolan's confident and irreverent commanding officer, Captain Andersen used to be a Marine, serving with the military police. After leaving the Corps, she spent a year with the United States Pentagon Police Criminal Investigations Directorate before joining the LAPD. Because of her prior experience, Andersen has risen up the ranks very quickly, to the point where some of her officers see her more as a boss than a fellow officer.
 Melissa O'Neil as Lucy Chen: An ambitious rookie (Police Officer II) who struggles to prove herself to Tim Bradford, her training officer. She is 29 years old, and her parents are psychologists who remain opposed to her choice of career.
 Afton Williamson as Talia Bishop (season 1): A newly promoted training officer (Police Officer III) whose first assignment is Nolan. Ambitious, she tries hard to make detective and hopes to eventually work her way up to chief of police.
 Eric Winter as Tim Bradford: A strict, no-nonsense training officer (Police Officer III/Sergeant I/Sergeant II). He is assigned Chen as a rookie and gives her a hard time but treats her fairly. He used to be a Marine squad leader who served in Iraq and Afghanistan before joining the LAPD.)
 Mekia Cox as Nyla Harper (season 2–present): Nolan's new training officer (Police Detective I), a tough, experienced detective who is leaving behind four years of undercover work so that she can return to patrol work.
 Shawn Ashmore as Wesley Evers (season 3–present; recurring seasons 1–2): A defense lawyer with whom Lopez initially clashes but later starts dating.
 Jenna Dewan as Bailey Nune (season 4–present; guest season 3): A firefighter who first appears as Nolan's date to Lopez's wedding and later becomes his girlfriend.
 Tru Valentino as Aaron Thorsen (season 5; recurring season 4): A newbie rookie (Police Officer I) who was involved in a murder case in which he was found not guilty.

Recurring
 Mircea Monroe as Isabel Bradford (season 1): Tim Bradford's ex-wife, a former undercover narcotics officer who turned into a drug addict
 Sara Rue as Nell Forester (seasons 1–2; guest season 4): A former dispatcher for the LAPD whom Bradford bribes in order to get the best calls.
 Currie Graham as Ben McRee (season 1; guest season 3): Nolan's friend since their schooldays, who lets Nolan stay in his mansion as a house guest
 Demetrius Grosse as Kevin Wolfe (season 1): A detective who is assigned to Isabel's case
 David DeSantos as Elijah Vestri (season 1): A detective who is assigned to Isabel's case. He is shot and killed midway during the first season in a shootout with a gang of drug dealers. 
 Zayne Emory as Henry Nolan: John Nolan's son who is a freshman in college. He becomes engaged to Abigail in the second season. He is shown to have a congenital heart condition in season three.
 Michael Beach as Percy West (seasons 1–3): Jackson's father, the commander of Internal Affairs
 Brent Huff as Quigley Smitty: A lazy training officer who lives in a trailer park across the street from the Mid-Wilshire station. In token of his under-the-radar attitude, he is usually only seen at roll call.
 Angel Parker as Luna Grey: Wade Grey's wife and mother of their daughter Dominique
 Sarah Shahi as Jessica Russo (seasons 1–2): A former FBI hostage negotiator who now runs her own security firm and is a published author.
 Matthew Glave as Oscar Hutchinson: A prisoner who escapes from a prison bus crash but is later apprehended by Lopez and West. Hutchinson eventually helps the precinct officers as an informant on several cases including former prisoners.
 Harold Perrineau as Nick Armstrong (season 2; guest season 3): A new night detective who assists the LAPD Mid-Wilshire Division
 Daniel Lissing as Sterling Freeman (season 2; guest season 3): A celebrity actor starring in a police procedural show.
 Ali Larter as Grace Sawyer (season 2): A doctor at Shaw Memorial Hospital.
 Enver Gjokaj as Donovan Town (seasons 2, 4): Harper's ex-husband. Harper is fighting with him over joint custody of their daughter Lila. 
 Carsyn Rose as Lila Town (seasons 2, 4): Harper's daughter from her marriage to Donovan
 Madeleine Coghlan as Abigail (seasons 2–3): Henry Nolan's fiancée.
 Annie Wersching as Rosalind Dyer (seasons 2, 5; guest season 3): A serial killer and nemesis of Armstrong, the officer who had her convicted for murder.
 Jeff Pierre as Emmett Lang (season 2): A firefighter who is a friend of Tim Bradford.
 Hrach Titizian as Ruben Derian (season 2; guest season 3): A member of the Derian crime family who has recruited Armstrong and Erin Cole to help him destroy evidence that implicates his brother Serj for the murder of Chris Rios 
 Brandon Routh as Doug Stanton (season 3): Jackson West's new training officer.
 Arjay Smith as James Murray (season 3–present): A local resident in the neighborhood where Nolan and Harper are assigned to community outreach.
 Toks Olagundoye as Fiona Ryan (season 3): A professor in Ethics and Criminal Justice. Nolan attends her night classes in order to finish school and qualify as a training officer. She is also a well-known activist, specifically in civil rights and police reform, and has authored a book about racial inequality in the justice system.
 Dylan Conrique as Tamara Colins (season 3–present): a homeless high school student Chen takes under her wing and tries to help cope with her situation
 Camille Guaty as Sandra "La Fiera" De La Cruz (season 3; guest season 4): A Guatemalan businesswoman and drug-lord.
 Lisseth Chavez as Celina Juarez (season 5–present): Nolan's enthusiastic new rookie (Police Officer I)

Notable guests
 Danny Nucci as Sanford Motta: An arrogant major assault crimes detective who looks down on rookies
 Shawn Christian as Jeremy Hawke: Nolan's former training officer at the Academy who goes rogue
 Joelle Carter as Megan Mitchell: Hawke's ex-wife who is fighting with him over custody of their son Logan
 Niko Nicotera as Carson Miller: Isabel's former boyfriend and a drug dealer
 Jose Pablo Cantillo as Franco DeSantis: A drug dealer who steals money from a drug bust after being tipped off
 Beau Garrett as Denise: A woman who Nolan rescues on Valentine's Day who has an unhealthy obsession with him
 Sean Maher as Caleb Jost: A prisoner who escapes from the prison bus crash in "Manhunt" but is later apprehended by Nolan, Bishop, and Russo
 Mario Lopez as himself: A celebrity pulled over by Bradford and Chen for running a stop sign who tries to talk his way out of a ticket as part of an integrity test by LAPD Internal Affairs
 Joel McHale as Brad Hayes: A former border patrol officer turned people smuggler for a cartel, who is placed under the protective detail of Bradford and Nolan
 Michael Trucco as Sean Del Monte: An assistant district attorney who assigns Nolan and Bradford to a protective detail in "The Shake Up". He later returns in the second-season episode "The Dark Side" when he makes a deal with Rosalind Dyer in order to find the bodies of her previous victims.
 Jim Lau as Patrick Chen: Lucy Chen's father, who is injured by one of his patients and forced to go the hospital. He later has an argument with Chen regarding the LAPD's handling of mental health cases.
 will.i.am as himself: Appears when a silent alarm is tripped at his residence, caused by a man who accidentally parachuted into the wrong yard and became stuck in a tree
 Stephen Lang as Williams: The LAPD chief of police. He administers the oral exam to Nolan, Chen, and West during their midterm exam.
 Felicia Day as Dr. Morgan: A CDC task-force specialist in infectious diseases
 Mark Cuban as himself: Appears when Nolan and Grey respond to a disturbance at his restaurant
 Mitch Pileggi as Rex: A bounty hunter and retired LAPD cop. He is good friends with Bradford.
 Seamus Dever as Chaz Bachman: A lawyer who is arrested by Nolan and Lopez for buying drugs
 Jon Huertas as Alejandro Mejia / Cesar Ojeda: An undercover DHS agent who is compromised and nearly killed by two assailants seeking information from him
 Lauren Tom as Mrs. Chen: Lucy Chen's mother, who comes to stay at her apartment briefly after having an argument with Chen's father
 Eric Weddle as himself: appeared during a Los Angeles Rams junior football camp. Was a high school football adversary of Bradford's.
 Robert Woods as himself: appeared during a Los Angeles Rams junior football camp
 Alan Tudyk as Ellroy Basso: A cleaner employed by the LAPD to help clean up crime scenes. He and Nolan later apprehend the criminals who committed the original crime when they return to the scene. He is later seen to be in a relationship with Nell Forester.
 Michael Cassidy as Caleb Wright: A man whom Chen meets at a bar who later turns out to be a serial killer and Rosalind Dyer's associate
 Pete Davidson as Pete Nolan: Nolan's half-brother whom he meets following his father's death
 Seth Green as Jordan Neil: A man who steals Nolan's identity, causing his credit score to go down
 Roselyn Sánchez as Valerie Castillo: An ambitious reporter
 Bailey Chase as Michael Banks: A DEA agent who assists Nolan and Harper during a drug raid
 Don Swayze as Sharp: A prison guard deputy at the California Correctional Facility who assists Nolan and Harper during a riot
 Hannah Kasulka as Erin Cole: A rookie officer who is later revealed to be a dirty cop working for the Derians
 Christopher O'Shea as Chris Rios: A rookie officer who is fatally shot by Serj Derian, leaving West devastated as the two had been close friends
 Frances Fisher as Evelyn Nolan: Nolan's overbearing and manipulative mother
 Frankie Muniz as Corey Harris: A former child actor who now runs a cult
 Skyler Samuels as Charlotte Luster: Corey's childhood co-star and friend
 Rainn Wilson as himself: A celebrity interviewed by a true crime documentary who owned the mummified body of Charlie Chaplin
 Molly Quinn as Ashley: The daughter of prisoner Oscar Hutchinson who is a person of interest in a kidnapping case
 Katy O'Brian as Rookie Katie Barnes
 Emily Deschanel as Sarah Nolan: Nolan's ex-wife and mother to their son Henry
 Kyle Secor as Sam Taggart: A DEA special agent assigned to the La Fiera case
 Joshua Malina as Max: A man with ties to U.S. intelligence
 Brandon Jay McLaren as Elijah Stone: A crime boss who forces Evers to be his crooked lawyer
 Kathryn Prescott as Katerina Antonov / Linda Charles: A Russian FSB case officer who has gone rogue and was planning to kill all the men involved in a drone strike that killed her brother.
 Piper Curda as Billie Park: A drug mule who was arrested by West and Chen when she attempts to flee during a rolling stop
 Peyton List as Gennifer Bradford: Tim's younger sister and the daughter of Tom Bradford.
 James Remar as Tom Bradford: The alcoholic and abusive father of Tim and Gennifer Bradford.
 Flula Borg as Skip Tracer Randy, a bounty hunter
 Tamala Jones as Yvonne Thorsen: Aaron Thorsen's mother, who is trying to publicize his life as a police officer.
 Niecy Nash as Simone Clark: A trainee FBI agent who has the same priorities as John Nolan
Britt Robertson as Laura Stensen
Felix Solis as Matthew Garza
Kevin Zegers as Brendan Acres
Thomas Dekker as Jeffrey "Jeff" Boyle (Alias)/Eli Reynolds (Real name) on The Rookie: Feds
Bridget Regan as Monica Stevens, Elijah Stone's lawyer
Kelly Clarkson as herself
Kyle Schmid as Noah Foster, an U.C. detective who was a classmate of Chen at U.C. school
Preeti Desai as Charlie Bristow

Production

Development
On October 26, 2017, ABC announced a straight-to-series order for The Rookie, starring Castle star Nathan Fillion, and written by Castle executive producer and co-showrunner Alexi Hawley. Fillion and Hawley serve as executive producers, along with Mark Gordon, Nicholas Pepper, Michelle Chapman, and Jon Steinberg. The series is produced by ABC Studios and The Mark Gordon Company, and premiered on October 16, 2018. On November 5, 2018, The Rookie was picked up for full season of 20 episodes. On May 10, 2019, ABC renewed the series for a second season which premiered on September 29, 2019. On October 28, 2019, the series received a full season order of 20 episodes for the second season.

On May 21, 2020, ABC renewed the series for a third season which premiered on January 3, 2021. On May 14, 2021, ABC renewed the series for a fourth season, which premiered on September 26, 2021. On March 30, 2022, ABC renewed the series for a fifth season which premiered on September 25, 2022.

Casting
With the series order in October 2017, Fillion was cast as John Nolan. On February 7, 2018, Afton Williamson and Eric Winter were cast as Talia Bishop and Tim Bradford, respectively. They were shortly followed by Melissa O'Neil as Lucy Chen, Richard T. Jones as Sergeant Wade Grey, Titus Makin as Jackson West, Alyssa Diaz as Angela Lopez, and Mercedes Mason as Captain Zoe Andersen.

On August 4, 2019, it was announced that Williamson would not be returning for the second season due to the alleged racial discrimination, sexual harassment, and sexual assault she suffered during the first season. On October 2, 2019, Mekia Cox joined the cast as a new series regular, Nyla Harper, for the second season.

Filming
In January 2018, Liz Friedlander signed on to direct and executive produce the pilot. Production on the pilot began on March 7, 2018, with filming taking place in Los Angeles, Oxnard, Burbank and New York City. On April 15, 2021, police received a call of a possible shooting while filming was taking place between Hartford Avenue and West 5th Street in Los Angeles. Three gunshots were heard by various eyewitnesses and the production crew confirmed no one from the show was injured during the incident. Filming in the area was shut down as a result of the reports but filming continued at other already scheduled locations. Following the death of cinematographer Halyna Hutchins on October 21, 2021, on the set of the film Rust, live weapons were banned from The Rookie while filming. Prior to the ban, the series occasionally used quarter or half rounds on large outdoor set pieces. Showrunner Alexi Hawley stated that "any risk is too much risk" and explained that, going forward, only airsoft guns would be used, with muzzle flashes being added in post production using computer-generated imagery.

On-set misconduct and harassment allegations
On July 26, 2019, TVLine reported that Afton Williamson, who portrays Talia Bishop, would not be returning for the second season. While the outlet initially claimed that the split was amicable, Williamson, in a lengthy Instagram post, stated that she left the series due to having "experienced racial discrimination/racially charged inappropriate comments from the hair department." Williamson also alleged that she was sexually harassed by guest star Demetrius Grosse, who portrays Kevin Wolfe in a recurring role, as well as an incident of bullying that escalated into sexual assault at a party; the head of the hair department was identified as Sallie Ciganovich. Williamson claimed that she had gone to the showrunners multiple times with these allegations, but was ignored.

Everyone involved in the allegations denied them. An investigation was commissioned through the law firm Mitchell Sillerberg and Knupp along with a third-party firm, EXTTI, which conducted nearly 400 hours of interviews and examined video and other evidence. The results of the investigation were published on September 17, 2019, which found that the allegations made by Williamson had no merit and could not be proven. Williamson stood by her claims, calling the results of the investigation "heartbreaking" and postulated that the producers had lied to cover up the truth of what happened.

Release

Broadcast
The Rookie is broadcast in the United States on ABC. The first season aired on Tuesday, while the second season aired on Sunday.The Rookie has been licensed in more than 180 countries and territories.

Home media
The first season was released on DVD in Region1 on August27, 2019, and in Region4 (Australia) on January22, 2020.

Spin-off

On February 8, 2022, ABC ordered a pilot for a planned FBI spin-off of the series starring Niecy Nash. It was introduced in a two-episode backdoor pilot during the fourth season. On March 9, 2022, Kat Foster and Felix Solis joined the cast of the spin-off. Also that month, Frankie Faison joined the cast. On May 13, 2022, ABC gave a series order under the title The Rookie: Feds. It was then reported that the series had undergone creative tweaks that cut Foster's character, Special Agent Casey Fox. In June 2022, Britt Robertson, Kevin Zegers and James Lesure joined the cast as series regulars.

The series premiered on September 27, 2022.

Reception

Critical response
The review aggregation website Rotten Tomatoes reported a 68% approval rating with an average rating of 6.33/10 based on 22 reviews for the first season. The website's consensus reads, "Nathan Fillion's reliably likable presence makes The Rookie worth tuning in, even if the show around him isn't particularly memorable." Metacritic, which uses a weighted average, assigned a score of 64 out of 100 based on 12 critics, indicating "generally favorable reviews".

Ratings

Notes

References

External links
 
 

2010s American crime drama television series
2010s American mystery television series
2010s American police procedural television series
2020s American crime drama television series
2020s American mystery television series
2020s American police procedural television series
2018 American television series debuts
American Broadcasting Company original programming
English-language television shows
Fictional portrayals of the Los Angeles Police Department
Television series based on actual events
Television series by ABC Studios
Television series by Entertainment One
Television shows set in Los Angeles
 Television shows set in California